C.Elamaran also known as Blue Sattai Maran is an Indian film critic, YouTuber, director, actor and writer. He is one of the most watched reviewers on YouTube, where he hosts the channel Tamil Talkies.

Career

YouTube

Film direction

Filmography 
As director and writer

As actor

References

External links
 
 

Indian YouTubers
Indian film critics
Tamil film directors
Living people
Year of birth missing (living people)